Jeremy Bloom is an American former skier and American football player. As a skier, he is a one-time world champion, two-time Olympian, and 10-time World Cup gold medalist. He was inducted into the National Ski Hall of Fame in 2013.

Bloom was a freshman All-American at the University of Colorado. He was drafted by the Philadelphia Eagles in the 2006 NFL Draft and was also a member of the Pittsburgh Steelers, but did not play a competitive game for either team.

Personal life
Bloom was born in Fort Collins, Colorado, the son of Charlene, a ski and fly fishing instructor, and Larry Bloom, a clinical psychologist, and grew up in nearby Loveland. His older sister, Molly Bloom, is an author and former organizer of illegal poker games who wrote Molly's Game, and was the inspiration for the film of the same name. His cousin is ice hockey player Colby Cohen. Bloom's father is Jewish and his mother is Christian.

Skiing career

Bloom grew up skiing in Keystone, Colorado. At 15 he became the youngest male freestyle skier to ever make the United States Ski Team.

On November 24, 2008, Bloom announced his intention to attend the United States ski team's training camp to assess the possibility of a 2010 return to Olympic skiing.

Bloom was featured in The Weight of Gold (2020), an HBO Sports Documentary which "explor(es) the mental health challenges that Olympic athletes often face."

College football career
Bloom was a wide receiver and punt returner for the University of Colorado football team. He was selected to the first-team Freshman All-America list by the FWAA.

On October 5, 2002, Bloom caught a pass from Robert Hodge against Kansas State in Boulder that resulted in a  touchdown. On this play Bloom set four Colorado team records that stood as of 2020: all-time longest passing play, longest scoring play from scrimmage, longest gain on a first career reception, longest gain by a freshman.

Bloom holds the Colorado team record for most combined return yards (kick & punt) in a single game, set against Baylor University in Waco, Texas on October 4, 2003 (143 kickoff and 107 punt).

Professional football career

Philadelphia Eagles
On April 30, 2006, Bloom was selected by the Philadelphia Eagles in the fifth round (147th overall) of the 2006 NFL Draft. He was featured in the NFL TV show Hey Rookie, Welcome To The NFL. He practiced with the team all through mini-camp as a punt and kick returner, but injured his hamstring during training camp, placing him on injured reserve. Bloom remained with the team for the 2006 season. After spending his entire rookie year on injured reserve, Bloom averaged 20.3 yards on 12 kickoff returns and 7.8 yards on 10 punt returns during the 2007 preseason. He was released by the Eagles prior to the regular season.

Pittsburgh Steelers
On December 31, 2007, Bloom was signed by the Pittsburgh Steelers in preparation for the 2008 AFC playoff game against the Jacksonville Jaguars. He began 2008 training camp with the Steelers. He was released by the Steelers on August 25, 2008.

Other ventures
In March 2003, Bloom won the 30th annual CBS Superstars Competition in Jamaica; he defeated nine professional athletes that included Dexter Jackson, Ahman Green, and Will Allen.

In 2012, Bloom participated in the dating game show The Choice.

In April 2010, Bloom along with Hart Cunningham co-founded the marketing software company, Integrate. In 2013, Bloom was a finalist for the Ernst & Young Entrepreneur of the Year.

Bloom is a college football and Olympic sports television analyst and has worked for ESPN, Fox, NBC and The Pac-12 Network.

References

External links

U.S. Olympic Team bio
Philadelphia Eagles bio
Pittsburgh Steelers bio
The Wish of a Lifetime
 

1982 births
Living people
People from Loveland, Colorado
American male freestyle skiers
Male models from Colorado
Olympic freestyle skiers of the United States
American football return specialists
American football wide receivers
University of Colorado alumni
Colorado Buffaloes football players
Philadelphia Eagles players
Pittsburgh Steelers players
College football announcers
Freestyle skiers at the 2002 Winter Olympics
Freestyle skiers at the 2006 Winter Olympics
Participants in American reality television series
Jewish American sportspeople
Players of American football from Colorado
21st-century American Jews
Olympic Games broadcasters